Bonnyville-Cold Lake was a provincial electoral district in Alberta, Canada, mandated to return a single member to the Legislative Assembly of Alberta using the first past the post method of voting from 1997 to 2019.

Geography
 Bonnyville-Cold Lake is primarily rural electoral district is found in northeastern Alberta along the Saskatchewan border. The riding was coterminous with the Municipal District of Bonnyville No. 87, and also contains the following municipalities:

 The City of Cold Lake (including CFB Cold Lake)
 The Town of Bonnyville 
 The Village of Glendon
 The summer villages of Bonnyville Beach and Pelican Narrows 
 The Kehewin First Nation, the Cold Lake First Nations (in three reserves), and the Frog Lake First Nation (in two reserves: Unipouheos and Puskiakiwenin)
 The Elizabeth and Fishing Lake Métis Settlements in the southeast of the riding (not pictured on map).

The district bordered Lac La Biche-St. Paul-Two Hills to the North, West and Southwest, and Vermilion-Lloydminster to the Southeast.

History
The district was created in the 1997 Boundary redistribution from the electoral district of Bonnyville, retaining the same boundaries as the old district. The riding had been held from its creation until 2015 by the Progressive Conservatives, although the Liberals held the antecedent riding from 1993 to 1997.

The 2003 electoral boundary re-distribution saw the riding lose some uninhabited territory in its north, part of the Cold Lake Air Weapons Range, to Lac La Biche-St. Paul-Two Hills. This gave Bonnyville-Cold Lake the same boundaries as the Municipal District.

In the 2010 electoral boundary re-distribution the riding remained unchanged with no boundary alterations from the 2003 boundaries.

The Bonnyville-Cold Lake electoral district was dissolved in the 2017 electoral boundary re-distribution, and would be renamed Bonnyville-Cold Lake-St. Paul electoral district for the 2019 Alberta general election.

Boundary history

Representation history

In the district's first election in 1997, Progressive Conservative candidate Dennis Ducharme defeated incumbent Liberal MLA Leo Vasseur by a wide margin to pick up the newly-renamed district for his party.

Ducharme was re-elected with landslides in 2001 with over 70% of the vote and in 2004 with almost 65% of the vote. He was appointed to the cabinet briefly in 2006 under the government of Ralph Klein. He retired in 2008.

The second representative of the district was Genia Leskiw. She won her first election with a landslide of over 75% of the popular vote, and held the riding from Wildrose challenger Roy Doonanco in 2012 by only a 7% margin.

In the 2015 election, Wildrose candidate Scott Cyr won by a significant margin over Progressive Conservative candidate Craig Copeland, who was running during a hiatus from being the mayor of Cold Lake. He subsequently joined the United Conservative Party when the parties merged in 2017.

Despite the hotly contested elections in 2012 and 2015, Ducharme, Leskiw, Cyr, and Copeland jointly endorsed Jason Kenney for Conservative leader in its 2017 leadership election.

Election results

1997 general election

2001 general election

2004 general election

2008 general election

2012 general election

2015 general election

Senate nominee results

2004 Senate nominee election district results

Voters had the option of selecting 4 Candidates on the Ballot

2012 Senate nominee election district results

Voters had the option of selecting 3 Candidates on the Ballot

Student Vote results

2004 election

On November 19, 2004 a Student Vote was conducted at participating Alberta schools to parallel the 2004 Alberta general election results. The vote was designed to educate students and simulate the electoral process for persons who have not yet reached the legal majority. The vote was conducted in 80 of the 83 provincial electoral districts with students voting for actual election candidates. Schools with a large student body that reside in another electoral district had the option to vote for candidates outside of the electoral district then where they were physically located.

2012 election

See also
List of Alberta provincial electoral districts

References

Further reading

External links
Elections Alberta
The Legislative Assembly of Alberta

Former provincial electoral districts of Alberta
Cold Lake, Alberta